Disynaphia is a genus of South American flowering plants in the family Asteraceae.

 Species

References

Eupatorieae
Asteraceae genera
Flora of South America